Claymont High School is a public high school in Uhrichsville, Ohio, United States. It is part of the Claymont City Schools district.

Ohio High School Athletic Association state championships 

 Boys Wrestling – 1992 
 Girls Basketball – 1981

Notable alumni 
 Cody Garbrandt, professional mixed martial artist

References

External links 
 

High schools in Tuscarawas County, Ohio
Public high schools in Ohio